Battle of Bornhöved can refer to:
Battle of Bornhöved (798), or the first battle of Bornhöved, in 798
Battle of Bornhöved (1227), or the second Battle of Bornhöved, in 1227
Battle of Bornhöved (1813), or the third Battle of Bornhöved, in 1813, between Sweden and Denmark